Mandhra may refer to:

Mandhra, Khyber Pakhtunkhwa - a town in Pakistan
an alternative spelling of Mandra, a town in Attica, Greece